Lý Nam Đế (chữ Hán: 李南帝,  503 – 13 April 548), personal name Lý Bí or Lý Bôn (李賁), was the founder of the Early Lý dynasty of Vietnam, ruling from 544 to 548.

Overview
Lý Bôn (李賁, sometimes read as Lý Bí) was a local aristocrat whose far distant ancestors were Chinese refugees who fled Wang Mang's seizure of power during the interregnum between the Western and Eastern Han dynasties five centuries earlier. He was a regional magistrate of Giao Châu (交州, Chinese: Jiaozhou), an area of northern Vietnam roughly corresponding to the area of modern Hanoi. The Nan Qi shu (Book of Southern Qi) and Chen shu (Book of Chen) assert that Lý Bôn was part of the localized Sinitic-speaking ruling elite of the Red River Delta who wished to establish his own dynasty. His kinsmen Lý Phật Tử's identity appears to be more ambiguous, sometimes was referred in Chinese texts as a "Lǐ man of Jiaozhou" (Jiaozhou lǐ rén) and "great leader of Jiaozhou" (Jiaozhou jushuai). Catherine Churchman (2016) suggests that perhaps due to massive influences of indigenous preexisting non-Chinese Li Lao drum culture ( 200–750 AD) that stretching all the way from the Pearl to the Red River in Southern China and Northern Vietnam, Sinitic immigrants from the north and people with Sinitic ancestry in the areas had gradually accustomed themselves with local culture.

During this time China was experiencing constant civil war. Lý Bí became increasingly frustrated with the corruption in the government and hostility toward the local population. His friend Phạm Tu, subsequently helped him train a small army. Subsequently, Lý Bí resigned his post and revolted in 541 against the Liang who ruled Jiaozhou (Northern Vietnam) at the time. He gathered the local nobility and tribes within the Red River Valley, gathered together an army and navy, and won a decisive battle in Hepu in summer 543, expelling the Liang from Northern Vietnam region. The following year in February 544, Lý Bí was declared emperor by the people with the intention of demonstrating equality in status to China's own emperors. He named the new kingdom "Vạn Xuân" (萬春, literally "Eternal Spring"). His armies also repelled attacks from Champa in the south who had allied with the Liang at the time.

Further in his life 

Lý Nam Đế established his capital at Long Biên (modern-day Hanoi), surrounded himself with effective leadership in military and administrative scholars. Lý Nam Đế was also strongly supported by famous military commanders such as Phạm Tu, Triệu Túc, Tinh Thiều, and Triệu Quang Phục, (son of Triệu Tuc, later known as Triệu Việt Vương). The latter emerged as a hero in Vietnamese history and eventually succeeded Lý Nam Đế as ruler in 548. Lý Nam Đế built many fortresses at strategic locations throughout Vạn Xuân to fend off potential threats from Han in the north and from the Champa Kingdom in the south. He also established the first national university for scholars, implemented land reforms, and promoted literacy amongst the population. He laid the foundation for many reforms modeled after the Chinese social structure.

However, the new state was not long at peace. In October of 544 the Liang dynasty sent an army to reoccupy Jiaozhou and put down the rebellion, led by general Chen Baxian. By spring of 545, Chen had ravaged much of Jiaozhou. His initial invasion was stalled by Ly Bi's forces for months. However, in the winter of 545, Chen surprised the capital during the monsoon season. Lý Nam Đế's army were caught off guard, and his court was forced to abandon Long Biên and flee westward into the neighboring western highland. The Lý army became exhausted and Lý Bi himself grew increasingly ill due to months of being exposed in the wilderness. Lý Nam Đế realized that his illness would not enable him to rally the troops and accomplish a successful resistance against the imperial Chinese forces. In February 548, he relinquished imperial authority and transferred his power to his older brother Lý Thiên Bảo (co-ruler from 548 until his death in 555) and Triệu Quang Phục (r. 548–571), who was his best lieutenant and general.

By April 548, while suffering from serious disease for months, Lý Nam Đế died somewhere in Northwest Vietnam between the Red and the Black River when local Qiūlǎo (鳩獠) or the Qūlǎo (屈獠) tribesmen assassinated him in hope of warding off the invading Liang army. His immediate successor was Triệu Quang Phục (thereafter known as Triệu Việt Vương, which means Trieu Viet King). The new king continued the resistance and eventually drove the Chinese out from Vạn Xuân in 550. Although China had occupied and would continue to occupy Vietnam for approximately 1,000 years, Lý Nam Đế had successfully established a state that had given Northern Vietnam approximately 60 years of independence.

Anterior Lý dynasty
 Lý Nam Đế I (r. 542–548)
 Lý Thiên Bảo (r. 548–555, co-reigned with Triệu Quang Phục)
 Triệu Việt Vương (r. 548–571, 555–571 as sole ruler)
 Lý Nam Đế II (r. 571–602)

References

Bibliography

 

503 births
548 deaths
6th-century Vietnamese people
Vietnamese monarchs
Founding monarchs